This is a list of carrot dishes and foods, which use carrot as a primary ingredient. The carrot (Daucus carota subsp. sativus) is a root vegetable, usually orange in colour, though purple, red, white, and yellow varieties exist.

Carrot dishes
 
 Carrot bread – a bread or quick bread that uses carrot as a primary ingredient
 Carrot cake
 Carrot cake cookie
 Carrot chips – sliced carrots that have been fried or dehydrated
Carrot hot dog - carrot cured in hot dog spices and grilled
 Carrot juice – has a uniquely sweet flavor of concentrated carrots, and is often consumed as a health drink
 Carrot pudding – can be served as either a savory pudding or as a sweet dessert
 Carrot salad – recipes vary widely by regional cuisine, and shredded carrot is often used. Shredded carrot salads are also sometimes used as a topping for other dishes.
 Morkovcha
 Carrot soup – may be prepared as a cream-style soup and as a broth-style soup.
 Cezerye – gelatinous confection made with carrots
 Chai tow kway
 Gajar ka halwa – a carrot-based sweet dessert pudding from the Indian subcontinent
 Glazed carrots
 
 Kimpira - a Japanese dish which main ingredient is root vegetables, such as gobos and carrots
 Mashed carrots – usually served as a side dish to meat and/or vegetables
 Porkkanalaatikko
 Tzimmes

See also

 Carrot seed oil
 List of vegetable dishes

References

Edible Apiaceae
Carrot